was a Japanese photographer best known for extensively photographing Nagasaki the day after it was bombed.

Biography 
Yamahata was born in Singapore; his father, Shōgyoku Yamahata (later to become known as a photographer) had a job there related to photography. He went to Tokyo in 1925 and eventually started at Hosei University (Tokyo) but dropped out in 1936 to work in G. T. Sun (Jīchīsan Shōkai, aka Graphic Times Sun), a photographic company run by his father. (He would become its president in 1947.) From 1940, Yamahata worked as a military photographer in China and elsewhere in Asia outside Japan; he returned to Japan in 1942.

Photography of immediate after-effects the Nagasaki atomic bombing 
On August 10, 1945, a day after the Nagasaki bombing, Yamahata began to photograph the devastation, still working as a military photographer. Over a period of about twelve hours he took around a hundred exposures; by late afternoon, he had taken his final photographs near a first aid station north of the city. In a single day, he had completed the only extensive photographic record of the immediate aftermath of the atomic bombing of either Hiroshima or Nagasaki.

Publication 
Yamahata's photographs appeared swiftly in Japan, for example in the August 21 issue of Mainichi Shinbun. After the GHQ's restrictions on coverage of the effects of the atomic bomb were lifted earlier in 1952, his photographs of Nagasaki appeared in the September 29 issue of Life. The same year, they appeared in the book Kiroku-shashin: Genbaku no Nagasaki. One which was used in Life, also appeared in the 1955 exhibition and book "The Family of Man" an exhibition created for The Museum of Modern Art by Edward Steichen, which was seen by 9 million visitors worldwide. One of the less graphic, but more affecting images, it depicted a bewildered little boy, clutching a rice ball, with shrapnel cuts to the face. The head-and-torso enlargement was cropped tightly from a negative that had also showed his mother, also with facial wounds, standing behind, against a background of railway tracks.

Illness and death 
Yamahata became violently ill in 1965, on his forty-eighth birthday and the twentieth anniversary of the bombing of Hiroshima. He was diagnosed with terminal cancer of the duodenum. He is buried at Tama Cemetery, Tokyo.

Preservation and ongoing circulation of Yamahata's Nagasaki images 
Restoration work was done on Yamahata's negatives after his death. An exhibition of prints, "Nagasaki Journey", traveled to San Francisco, New York, and Nagasaki in commemoration of the 50th anniversary of the bombing.

Yamahata's photographs of Nagasaki remain the most complete record of the atomic bombing as seen immediately after the bombing. The New York Times has called his photographs "some of the most powerful images ever made".

Gallery

Books of Yamahata's works

 Kiroku-shashin: Genbaku no Nagasaki. Daiichi Shuppansha, 1952.
 Genbaku no Nagasaki. Tokyo: Gakufū Shoin, 1959.
 Nagasaki Journey: The Photographs of Yosuke Yamahata August 10, 1945. San Francisco: Pomegranate, 1995. .
 Nagasaki yomigaeru genbaku shashin. Tokyo: NHK, 1995. .
 Yamahata Yōsuke. Nihon no shashinka 23. Tokyo: Iwanami, 1998. .

See also
Yoshito Matsushige – Hiroshima photographer

Notes

Sources

  Hirakata . "Yamahata Yōsuke". Nihon shashinka jiten / 328 Outstanding Japanese Photographers. Kyoto: Tankōsha, 2000. . Despite the English-language alternative title, all in Japanese.
Kaku: Hangenki / The Half Life of Awareness: Photographs of Hiroshima and Nagasaki. Tokyo: Tokyo Metropolitan Museum of Photography, 1995.  Exhibition catalogue; captions and text in both Japanese and English. Fifteen pages of Yamahata's photographs of Nagasaki; also works by Ken Domon, Toshio Fukada, Kikujirō Fukushima, Shigeo Hayashi, Kenji Ishiguro, Shunkichi Kikuchi, Mitsugi Kishida, Eiichi Matsumoto, Yoshito Matsushige, Shōmei Tōmatsu, and Hiromi Tsuchida. Text and captions in both Japanese and English.
  Nihon no shashinka / Biographic Dictionary of Japanese Photography. Tokyo: Nichigai Associates, 2005. . Despite the English-language alternative title, all in Japanese.

External links 

Photographs of Hiroshima and Nagasaki
Nagasaki Journey, The Photographs of Yosuke Yamahata, presented by the San Francisco Exploratorium

1917 births
1966 deaths
Japanese photographers
Hibakusha
Hosei University alumni
Japanese people of World War II